1925 in Argentine football saw Huracán winning its 3rd. Asociación Argentina de Football (AFA) championship while Racing Club won the dissident league AAm championship, being the 9th. title for the club.

Primera División

Asociación Argentina de Football - Copa Campeonato
Sportivo del Norte changed its name to "Club Atlético Colegiales" and Platense II to "Retiro" (and later to "Universal") while Villa Urquiza changed to "General San Martín".

Championship playoff

Asociación Amateurs de Football

Lower divisions

Primera B
AFA Champion: Sportivo Balcarce
AAm Champion: Talleres (BA)

Primera C
AFA Champion: Sportivo Balcarce II
AAm Champion: Perla del Plata

Domestic cups

Copa de Competencia (AAm)
Champion: Independiente

Final

Copa de Competencia Jockey Club
Champion: Boca Juniors

Final

Copa Ibarguren
Champion: Huracán

Final

Argentina national team
Argentina won the 1925 Copa América played at its own country, being Brazil the runner-up.

References

 
Seasons in Argentine football
1925 in South American football